Centronia is a genus of plants in the family Melastomataceae.

Species include:
 Centronia brachycera (Naudin) Triana
 Centronia laurifolia D.Don
 Centronia mutisii (Bonpl.) Triana
 Centronia peruviana J.F.Macbr.

 
Melastomataceae genera
Taxonomy articles created by Polbot
Taxa named by David Don
Taxa described in 1823